The following is the 1958–59 network television schedule for the four major English language commercial broadcast networks in the United States. The schedule covers primetime hours from September 1958 through March 1959. The schedule is followed by a list per network of returning series, new series, and series cancelled after the 1957–58 season.

According to television historians Castleman and Podrazik (1982), the networks' schedules were thrown "into complete chaos" by the quiz show scandals that erupted during fall 1958. At first only one series, Dotto, was implicated in the game-fixing charges. Ed Hilgemeier, a contestant on the program, filed a complaint with the show's sponsor, Colgate-Palmolive. Colgate withdrew its sponsorship of the Tuesday evening (on NBC) and daytime (on CBS) versions of Dotto, and the show did not appear on either network's fall 1958 schedule.

The $64,000 Challenge (on CBS) similarly did not appear that fall, and by November, The $64,000 Question (CBS) and Twenty-One (NBC) were also removed from the network schedules, amidst accusations of game rigging. NBC's primetime Tic-Tac-Dough lasted through December. According to Castleman and Podrazik, "NBC and CBS were adamant in their own statements of innocence" since they only aired, and did not produce, the rigged series. They also claimed the cancellations were due to low ratings, not because of game-fixing accusations. ABC had few game shows on its 1958–59 schedule, and "eagerly pointed out" its innocence in the quiz show mess. The network affirmed its commitment to Westerns, which could not be rigged.

Western TV series continued to be very popular with audiences, and for the first time, the three highest-rated programs on television, CBS's Gunsmoke, NBC's Wagon Train, and CBS's Have Gun – Will Travel, were all Westerns. ABC's new series, The Rifleman even hit #4, quite a feat for a network which had had no series in the top 30 five years earlier.

Although ABC, CBS, and NBC remained the largest television networks in the United States, they were not the only companies operating television networks during this era. In May 1958, Ely Landau, president of the NTA Film Network, announced an NTA Film Network schedule for the 1958–59 season. The schedule consisted of three and a half hours of programs on Friday nights: Man Without a Gun at 7:30, followed by This is Alice at 8:00, then How to Marry a Millionaire at 8:30, and Premiere Performance, a package of films from the network's minority shareholder 20th Century Fox, from 9:00 to 11:00. Although the NTA Film Network had over 100 affiliate stations, only 17 agreed to air the Friday night schedule "in pattern" (during the scheduled time). Other NTA Network affiliates carried the network's programs whenever they had available slots, and outside of Gun, Alice, Millionaire and Performance, NTA's programs were aired whenever the local stations preferred. National Educational Television (NET), the predecessor to PBS founded in 1952, also allowed its affiliate stations to air programs out of pattern.

New series are highlighted in bold.

All times are U.S. Eastern and Pacific time (except for some live sports or events). Subtract one hour for Central and Mountain times.

Each of the 30 highest-rated shows is listed with its rank and rating as determined by Nielsen Media Research.

Legend

Sunday 

NOTES: The Canadian-produced anthology series Encounter aired only five episodes on ABC before cancellation.

Deadline for Action on ABC consisted of reruns of episodes that starred Dane Clark of the 1956–1957 series Wire Service.

From February to September 1959, Richard Diamond, Private Detective, starring David Janssen, aired for a third and final season on CBS, on the Sunday schedule at 10 p.m. Eastern. It switched to NBC and returned to the air for a fourth season during the 1959–60 television season.

Monday 

Note: The Westinghouse Lucille Ball-Desi Arnaz Show was later rebroadcast and syndicated as The Lucy-Desi Comedy Hour. In most areas, Douglas Edwards with the News and The Huntley-Brinkley Report aired at 6:45 p.m.

Tuesday 

Confession, with host Jack Wyatt, which had begun as a local program in the Dallas, Texas, market in early 1957, premiered as a summer replacement on ABC on June 19, 1958, in advance of the 1958–59 television season. It ended on January 13, 1959, and was succeeded on January 20, 1959, by the paranormal anthology series Alcoa Presents: One Step Beyond.

Wednesday 

Notes: On CBS, Armstrong Circle Theatre alternated with The United States Steel Hour. Armstrong by Request, which also alternated with The United States Steel Hour and aired in place of Armstrong Circle Theatre from July 8 to September 16, 1959, consisted of reruns of six documentary dramas which originally had aired on Armstrong Circle Theatre during the 1958–1959 season.

On NBC, Milton Berle starring in the Kraft Music Hall formerly was known as The Milton Berle Show.

Thursday 

The 90-minute series Jazz Party aired from May 8 to December 25, 1958, on WNTA-TV Thursdays at 9pm ET and was offered to NTA Film Network affiliates; a successor to a similar program on the NYC DuMont station WABD, Art Ford's Greenwich Village Party, as the DuMont Network was ceasing operations.

Friday 

Note: On January 9, Phillies Jackpot Bowling premiered in the 10:45-11 p.m. spot on NBC, while on March 13 Tombstone Territory replaced Man with a Camera on the ABC schedule.

Saturday 

Note: On NBC, Brains & Brawn was replaced on January 3, 1959, by The D.A.'s Man. On CBS, Markham premiered Saturday, May 2, 1959, at 10:30 pm.

By network

ABC

Returning Series
The Adventures of Ozzie and Harriet
The Adventures of Rin Tin Tin
Anybody Can Play/Anyone Can Play
The Billy Graham Crusade
Bold Journey
Cheyenne
Colt .45
Confession
Dick Clark's Saturday Night Beach-Nut Show
Dr. I.Q.
John Daly and the News
Jubilee USA
Lawrence Welk's Dodge Dancing Party
Lawrence Welk's Plymouth Show
Leave It to Beaver (moved from CBS)
The Life and Legend of Wyatt Earp
Maverick
Pantomime Quiz
The Pat Boone Chevy Showroom
The Patti Page Oldsmobile Show
Polka Go-Round
The Real McCoys
Sugarfoot
Tales of the Texas Rangers
This is Music
Tombstone Territory
Top Pro Golf
Traffic Court
The Voice of Firestone
Walt Disney Presents
The Wednesday Night Fights
You Asked For It
Zorro

New Series
77 Sunset Strip
ABC News
Accused *
Alcoa Presents: One Step Beyond *
Bronco
The Donna Reed Show
Encounter
The Lawman
Man with a Camera
Music for a Summer Night *
Naked City
The Patti Page Oldsmobile Show
The Rifleman
Rough Riders
Sammy Kaye's Music from Manhattan *

Not returning from 1957–58:
Adventure at Scott Island
The Adventures of Jim Bowie
All-American Football Game of the Week
American Odyssey
The Betty White Show
Bowling Stars
Broken Arrow
Campaign Roundup
Circus Boy
Cowtown Rodeo
Country Music Jubilee
Date with the Angels
Disneyland
Famous Fights
The Frank Sinatra Show
The Guy Mitchell Show
Keep It in the Family
Lawrence Welk's Top Tunes and New Talent
Love That Jill
Make Me Laugh
Midwestern Hayride
The Mike Wallace Interview
Navy Log
O.S.S.
Open Hearing
The Patrice Munsel Show
Scotland Yard
Telephone Time
The Walter Winchell File
The West Point Story

CBS

Returning Series
The $64,000 Question
Alfred Hitchcock Presents
Armstrong Circle Theatre
Bachelor Father
The Danny Thomas Show
December Bride
Douglas Edwards and the News
DuPont Show of the Month
The Ed Sullivan Show
Father Knows Best (moved from NBC)
Frontier Justice
The Gale Storm Show
General Electric Theatre
Gunsmoke
Have Gun — Will Travel
Keep Talking
I've Got a Secret
The Invisible Man
The Jack Benny Program
Lassie
The Lineup
The Millionaire
Name That Tune
Perry Mason
Person to Person
The Phil Silvers Show
Playhouse 90
The Red Skelton Show
Richard Diamond, Private Detective
Schlitz Playhouse
The Spike Jones Show
That's My Boy
To Tell the Truth
Trackdown
The Twentieth Century
The United States Steel Hour
What's My Line
Your Hit Parade (moved from NBC)
Zane Grey Theater

New Series
The Andy Williams Show
The Ann Sothern Show
Armstrong by Request *
The Arthur Godfrey Show
Brenner
The Garry Moore Show *
The Invisible Man
The Jackie Gleason Show
Lux Playhouse
Markham *
Peck's Bad Girl *
The Phil Silvers Show
Pursuit
Stars in Action
The Texan
Trackdown
Wanted: Dead or Alive
Westinghouse Desilu Playhouse
Westinghouse Lucille Ball-Desi Arnaz Show
Yancy Derringer

Not returning from 1957–58:
The $64,000 Challenge
The Adventures of Robin Hood
Arthur Godfrey's Talent Scouts
Assignment: Foreign Legion
Bid 'n' Buy
The Big Record
The Boing Boing Show
Climax!
Dick and the Duchess
The Eve Arden Show
The George Burns and Gracie Allen Show
Leave it to Beaver (moved to ABC)
Mr. Adams and Eve
Sergeant Preston of the Yukon
Shower of Stars
Studio One in Hollywood
Tales of the Texas Rangers
Top Dollar

NBC

Returning Series
Alcoa Theatre
The Arthur Murray Party
Bachelor Father
The Bob Cummings Show
Buckskin
The Californians
Colgate Theatre
Concentration
The Dinah Shore Chevy Show
Dragnet
The Eddie Fisher Show
Fight Beat
The Ford Show
The George Gobel Show
Gillette Cavalcade of Sports
Goodyear Television Playhouse
The Huntley–Brinkley Report
It Could Be You
The Jack Benny Program
The Loretta Young Show
M Squad
Masquerade Party
Omnibus
People Are Funny
The Perry Como Show
The Price Is Right
The Restless Gun
Saber of London
The Steve Allen Show
Tales of Wells Fargo
The Thin Man
This Is Your Life
Tic-Tac-Dough
Twenty-One
Wagon Train
You Bet Your Life

New Series
21 Beacon Street *
The Adventures of Ellery Queen
The Art Carney Special *
Bat Masterson
Behind Closed Doors
Black Saddle *
Brains & Brawn
Cimarron City
The D.A.'s Man *
The David Niven Show *
Fight Beat *
The George Burns Show
Milton Berle starring in the Kraft Music Hall
Laugh Line *
The Lawless Years *
The Music Shop *
Northwest Passage
Oldsmobile Music Theatre *
Pete Kelly's Blues *
Peter Gunn
Steve Canyon *

Not returning from 1957–58:
The Big Game
The Bob Crosby Show
Colgate Theatre
Club Oasis with Spike Jones
The Court of Last Resort
Decision
Dotto
Dragnet
Father Knows Best (Moved to CBS)
The Gisele MacKenzie Show
The Investigator
It's a Great Life
The Jane Wyman Show
Kraft Television Theatre
The Life of Riley
The Lux Show Starring Rosemary Clooney
Meet McGraw
Music Bingo
The Nat King Cole Show
No Warning!
The Original Amateur Hour
The People's Choice
Red Barber's Corner
The Restless Gun
Saber of London
The Steve Lawrence and Eydie Gormé Show
The Subject is Jazz
Suspicion
Tic-Tac-Dough
What's It For?
Wide Wide World

NTA

Returning series
How to Marry a Millionaire
Man Without a Gun
Premiere Performance

New series
This is Alice

Note: The * indicates that the program was introduced in midseason.

References

 McNeil, Alex. Total Television. Fourth edition. New York: Penguin Books. .
 Brooks, Tim & Marsh, Earle (1964). The Complete Directory to Prime Time Network TV Shows (3rd ed.). New York: Ballantine. .

United States primetime network television schedules
United States network television schedule
United States network television schedule